Aigle Noir Athlétic Club (English: Black Eagle) commonly referred to as Aigle Noir, is a professional football club based in Bel Air, Port-au-Prince, Haiti.

History
The club was founded on 27 June 1951 as Aigle Noir Athlétique Club.

Since, the 2010 Haiti earthquake, the club is currently playing in the Stade Sylvio Cator until their home field, Parc de la Paix, is rebuilt.

Honours
Ligue Haïtienne: 4
 1953, 1955, 1970, 2006 F

Coupe d'Haïti: 1
 1960

International competitions
CONCACAF Champions League: 3 appearances
1971 – withdrew
1972 – unknown results
1984 – First Round (Caribbean 1984) Lost against  Victory Boys, 0–1

CFU Club Championship: 1 appearance
2006 – First Round – 4th in Group A – 0 pt (stage 1 of 3)

Current squad

References

Football clubs in Haiti
Port-au-Prince